Inman Harvey is a former senior lecturer in computer science and artificial intelligence at the University of Sussex; he is now a visiting senior research fellow at the same university. His research interests largely centre on the development of artificial evolution as an approach to the design of complex systems. Application domains of interest include evolutionary robotics, evolvable hardware, molecules for pharmaceutical purposes.

Together with other Sussex faculty, mainly from the School of Cognitive and Computer Sciences (COGS), he developed the MSc program on Evolutionary and Adaptive Systems (EASy), which was active in the 1990s and 2000s, attracting dozens of students that have contributed to artificial life,  evolutionary robotics, cognitive science and other disciplines.

Harvey's other interests include philosophical approaches to AI and artificial life (a non-representational, dynamical systems approach); passive dynamic walking; and Gaia theory. He originally started as a mathematician and philosopher at Cambridge University.

The article "Evolving a Conscious Machine" in the June 1998 issue of Discover magazine (pp. 72–79) overviews Harvey's and Adrian Thompson's work with evolving an FPGA program to recognize tones.

References

External links
Inman Harvey

Year of birth missing (living people)
Living people
People educated at Clifton College
British computer scientists
Academics of the University of Sussex
Researchers of artificial life